Boris Golovin (born 26 May 1955) is a New Zealand composer and poet with Russian background.

Education
1975–79. Moscow State University, faculty of journalism.

1982–87. Maxim Gorky Literature Institute, Moscow, faculty of poetry.

2013–17. University of Waikato, New Zealand. Conservatorium of Music.

2017–19.  School of Music The University of Auckland, New Zealand. Master of Music in Composition.

Occupation
Boris Golovin studied journalism at the Moscow State University and since that time became gradually known as a singer-songwriter who performed his songs, accompanied by the guitar, to live and TV audiences in Moscow and other parts of Russia. For example, some of his artistic tours were commissioned by the Northern Shipping Company which involved performances on cargo and fishing ships operating in the Arctic Ocean.
His songs were awarded at national music competitions.

Literary movement
Neoclassicism, modernism

Golovin published his first book of poetry in Moscow in 1987.
Since the late 1980s many readers have ranked Boris Golovin's poetry as one of the most influential in neoclassical movement. Though the poet himself has often emphasized that, strictly speaking, the word 'neoclassical' suffers from tautology since classical poetry as such descends from the Golden Age and fits both in the remote past and the future.
Boris Golovin has always strongly declined any association with literary grouping.

Books 
"The flight of a swift" ("Полёт стрижа") 1987
"Beetles and Giants" ("Жуки и великаны") 1999
 "An overcoat for two" ("Пальто на двоих") 2009
 "Jamé" (The mundane notes of an idiot). Book of poems. 2010 A.D." "ЖАМЭ" (Бытовые записки идиота). Книга стихотворений. 2010 A.D." 2011

Titles and honours
1990. The Russian Central House of Writers, Festival of singer-songwriters, Moscow. First Prize.
1995. The All-Russia singer-songwriters Fest (Ostankino, Russian TV Channel One, 1994) Second Prize.

External links
 SOUNZ The Butterfly of Zhuangzi
 Журнальный Зал. Борис Головин
  Борис Головин. А у прошлых бед и невзгод не спрашивай сдачи.

1955 births
New Zealand composers
University of Auckland alumni
Moscow State University alumni
Maxim Gorky Literature Institute alumni
Musicians from Yekaterinburg
Russian bards
Russian male poets
Russian composers
Russian male composers
Soviet poets
Soviet male writers
20th-century Russian male writers
Russian male singer-songwriters
Living people
Refugees
Writers from Yekaterinburg